Lin Feng may refer to:

People
 Lim Hong (pirate), a famous Chinese pirate in the 16th century of Philippines history
 Lin Feng (chess), former President of the Chinese Chess Association
 Lin Feng (politician), former President of the Party School of the Central Committee of the Communist Party of China
 Raymond Lam (born 1979), Hong Kong actor

Places
 Linfeng, Chongqing, a town in China